South Creek is a census-designated place located in Pierce County, Washington, United States. The population was 2,519 at the 2020 census.

Demographics

2020 census
As of the census of 2020, it had a population of 2,519 inhabitants. 958 housing units.

2010 census
As of the census of 2010, it had a population of 2,507 inhabitants. 989 housing units. 1,213 are male. 1,294 are female.

Geography
South Creek is located at coordinates 47°00′03″N 122°23′27″W.

References

Census-designated places in Pierce County, Washington